Gabriel Ramiro Vega (born 18 April 2002) is an Argentine footballer currently playing as a midfielder for Godoy Cruz, on loan from Boca Juniors.

Career statistics

Club

References

2002 births
Living people
Argentine footballers
Association football midfielders
People from La Matanza Partido
Sportspeople from Buenos Aires Province
Argentine Primera División players
Boca Juniors footballers
Godoy Cruz Antonio Tomba footballers